John or Jack Sanford may refer to:

John Sanford (author) (1904–2003), American author and screenwriter
John Sanford (governor) (1605–1653), founder of Portsmouth, Rhode Island
John Sanford (1803–1857), U.S. Representative from New York
John Sanford (1851–1939), U.S. Representative from New York
John A. Sanford (1929–2005), also known as Jack, Jungian psychoanalyst and Episcopal priest
John C. Sanford (born 1950), American plant geneticist, and an advocate of intelligent design and young earth creationism
John F. A. Sanford (1806–1857), Indian agent, fur trader and defendant in Dred Scott v. Sandford
John Langton Sanford (1824–1877), English historical writer
John W. A. Sanford (1798–1870), United States Congressional Representative from the state of Georgia
Jack Sanford (first baseman) (1917–2005), Major League Baseball first baseman
Jack Sanford (1929–2000), Major League Baseball pitcher
John E. Sanford (1830–1907), U.S. politician in Massachusetts

Others 
Redd Foxx (John Elroy Sanford, 1922–1991), American comedian and actor
John Sandford (disambiguation)